Balqa may refer to the following places:

Balqa (region), the central highland region of Jordan where Amman is situated.
Balqa Governorate, one of the governorates of Jordan, covering the part of the Balqa region around the city of Salt.
Al-Balqaʼ Applied University, a university in Salt.